I Don't Even Know is the eighth solo album by former Parliament-Funkadelic keyboardist Bernie Worrell. The album was released in 2010 by PurpleWOO Productions, Inc.

Track listing 

Bernie Worrell albums
2010 albums